is a Japanese actress who is affiliated with LesPros Entertainment. She graduated from Senzoku Gakuen College of Music. She is married to dancer Yoshihiro Usami since 2017.

Filmography

Films

References

External links
Official profile at LesPros Entertainment 
Official blog 
Official Twitter 

Japanese actresses
Japanese gravure idols
Japanese television personalities
1989 births
Living people
People from Tokyo